Chhayanath Rara is an urban municipality located in Mugu District of Karnali Province of Nepal.

The municipality is divided into total 14 wards.

The municipality was established on 10 March 2017, when Government of Nepal restricted all old administrative structure and announced 753 local level units as per the new constitution of Nepal 2015.

Shrinagar, Karkibada, Pina, part of Rara, Rowa, Gamgadhi and Ruga Village development committees were Incorporated to form this new municipality. The headquarters of the municipality is situated at Gamgadhi. The district headquarter of Mugu is also situated here.

Demographics
At the time of the 2011 Nepal census, Chhayanath Rara Municipality had a population of 20,457. Of these, 99.5% spoke Nepali, 0.2% Sherpa, 0.1% Gurung and 0.2% other languages as their first language.

In terms of ethnicity/caste, 60.1% were Chhetri, 16.0% Kami, 12.0% Thakuri, 5.4% Damai/Dholi, 2.6% other Dalit, 1.2% Hill Brahmin, 0.7% Newar, 0.4% Sarki, 0.4% Bhote and 1.2% others.

In terms of religion, 98.6% were Hindu, 0.8% Buddhist, 0.4% Christian and 0.2% others.

Transportation  
Talcha Airport lies in Old-Karkibada offering flights to Nepalgunj and Birendranagar.

References

External links
 http://www.chhayanathraramun.gov.np/
 https://www.citypopulation.de/php/nepal-mun-admin.php?adm2id=6501

Populated places in Mugu District
Municipalities in Karnali Province
Nepal municipalities established in 2017